Jean Hérault (1569 - 1626) was the Bailiff of Jersey for between 1615 and 1621 and 1624 and 1626 during the reign of King James I and IV.

He is noted as being "irritable, tetchy, vain, but ... incorruptible".

Life 
Hérault was born in 1569 to a Jersey family. He held a small post under the administration of Elizabeth I. He purchased half of Longueville Manor in 1595. He attended Oxford University, but did not graduate.

In 1615, Hérault was appointed Bailiff of Jersey, having been promised the role by Letters Patent in 1611. The Governor at the time, Peyton appealed against the decision, claiming it was his jurisdiction to appoint the Bailiff, but the King's orders triumph that of his Governor's. Hérault strongly believed in the importance and high position of the role of Bailiff, claiming it to be higher than that of the Governor. He ordered his name to be placed before the Governor's in church prayers and was the first Bailiff to wear red robes (in the style of English judges). To back his claims, he cited that in the Norman administrative tradition, the Bailiffs had "noone above them except the Duke". He frequently reported neglect of duty by Peyton, such as the reduction in the guard at Elizabeth Castle. This dispute led to one of the most major turning points in Jersey's constitutional history, as the powers of the Governor were clearly demarcated as military only, while civil and justice affairs were entirely in the jurisdiction of the Bailiff.

References 

Bailiffs of Jersey